Emmanuel Music is a Boston-based collective group of singers and instrumentalists founded in 1970 by Craig Smith. It was created specifically to perform the complete cycle of over 200 sacred cantatas of J. S. Bach in the liturgical setting for which they were intended, an endeavor twice completed and a tradition which continues today. Over the years, Emmanuel Music has garnered critical and popular acclaim through its presentations of large-scale and operatic works by Bach, Handel, Schubert, and Mozart as well as its in-depth exploration of the complete vocal, piano, and chamber works of Debussy, Brahms, Schubert, Schumann, and currently, Beethoven.

A unique aspect of Emmanuel performances is its selection of vocal and instrumental soloists from a corps of musicians who have long been associated with the group. Emmanuel Music has given rise to renowned musicians at the local, national, and international level; its long-standing association with Pulitzer Prize-winning composer John Harbison has also yielded a wealth of creative artistry.  Emmanuel Music has achieved international recognition from audiences and critics alike in its innovative collaborations with leading visionaries among the other arts, including the Mark Morris Dance Group and stage director Peter Sellars. Emmanuel Music made its European debut in 1989 in Brussels at the Théâtre de la Monnaie, and its New York City debut at Lincoln Center in 2001.

In a schedule that totals over fifty performances per year, guest conductors have included composer John Harbison, Seiji Ozawa, Christopher Hogwood, and Bach scholar Christoph Wolff. Emmanuel Music has been the subject of numerous national radio and television specials, and has completed nine recording projects featuring works of Heinrich Schütz, John Harbison, and J. S. Bach, including the critically acclaimed best seller Bach Cantatas BWV 82 & 199 featuring Lorraine Hunt Lieberson on the Nonesuch label hailed as one of the Top CDs of the Year by The New York Times, the Mozart Piano Concertos and Fantasies with pianist Russell Sherman on the Emmanuel Music label, and the latest release on the AVIE label, Lorraine at Emmanuel. A project to record the complete Motets by contemporary composer James Primosch, long-time friend of Emmanuel Music, is in the works.

Craig Smith died in 2007 and composer John Harbison was acting artistic director as the search for a successor took place.  Ryan Turner was named Artistic Director in 2010, with John Harbison continuing as Principal Guest Conductor.

Footnotes

External links
Official website
Boston Globe Obituary, "Craig Smith, 60; with Emmanuel, he created a nexus of joy and music," November 15, 2007

Musical groups from Boston
Culture of Boston
Musical groups established in 1970
Orchestras based in Massachusetts
1970 establishments in Massachusetts